Ceratobasidium setariae is a fungal plant pathogen.

References

External links

Fungal plant pathogens and diseases
Cantharellales
Fungi described in 1986